Jeffrey Lane Kimball, ASC (born May 29, 1943) is an American cinematographer.

Career

He majored in radio and television at North Texas State University in 1964. After graduation he landed a trainee position with Warner Brothers, but left to work as a gofer for still photographer Bill Langley. In 1969, he left Hollywood to work as a director of photography for the Dallas office of TV commercial production company N. Lee Lacy/Associates. He returned to Hollywood permanently in 1972 where he worked—mainly on low budget films—as an lab technician, still photographer, assistant director, and assistant cameraman, graduating to second unit director of photography on Hell Raiders, It's Alive, Cat People and others. Before becoming a feature film cinematographer, he had "earned his reputation for innovative and sometimes risky cinematography" in commercials, many of which had won awards.

He mainly shoots action films, especially films by Tony Scott, such as Top Gun, Beverly Hills Cop II, Revenge, and True Romance, and John Woo, such as Mission: Impossible 2, Windtalkers, Hostage, and Paycheck.

In addition to his work in features, he continues to work as a cinematographer on commercials and music videos. He also directs commercials, e.g. for Maketa Armada.

Kimball has been nominated for a Golden Satellite Award in 2001 for Mission: Impossible 2 and an MTV Video Music Award in 2011 for Beyoncé's "Run the World (Girls)." He has been a member of the American Society of Cinematographers since 1990.

Filmography

Films

Music videos
Slash feat. Fergie "Beautiful Dangerous" (dir. Rich Lee) (October 26, 2010)
Diddy – Dirty Money "Coming Home" (dir. Rich Lee) (November 29, 2010)
Beyoncé "Run the World (Girls)" (dir. Francis Lawrence) (May 18, 2011)
Jason Derulo "Don't Wanna Go Home" (dir. Rich Lee) (May 25, 2011)
Bad Meets Evil feat. Bruno Mars "Lighters" (dir. Rich Lee) (August 22, 2011)
will.i.am "T.H.E. (The Hardest Ever)" (dir. Rich Lee) (December 12, 2011)
Colbie Caillat feat. Common "Favorite Song" (dir. Jay Martin) (May 2, 2012)
A Great Big World and Christina Aguilera "Say Something (A Great Big World song)" (dir. Christopher Sims) (November 19, 2013)
Iggy Azalea "Team" (dir. Fabien Montique) (March 31. 2016)
Demi Lovato (dir. Ryan Pallotta)
Mary J. Blige (dir. Christopher Sims)
Nas & Damian Marley (dir. Nabil Elderkin)
R. Kelly (dir. Julien Lutz)

References

External links
Kimball's reel at the Partos Company

Jeffrey L. Kimball Biography (1943-) on Film Reference
Jeffrey Kimball on the Internet Encyclopedia of Cinematographers

1943 births
American cinematographers
Artists from Wichita, Kansas
Living people
University of North Texas alumni